Peter Biller, FBA FRHistS is Emeritus Professor of Medieval History at the University of York, where he has taught since 1970. Biller is general editor of the York Medieval Press, a Fellow of the Royal Historical Society and a Fellow of the British Academy. His research interests include academic thought, heresy, inquisition including AHRB funded research on inquisition trials, and medicine in medieval Europe. He is a member of Wellcome Medical History and Humanities Interview Committee, and of the board of Bollettino della Società di Studi Valdesi. He is married to mathematician Miggy Biller.

Education and fellowships

St Benedict's School, Ealing; Oriel College, Oxford (BA Modern Hist. 1966; MA 1970; DPhil 1974; Hon. Fellow 2017). FRHistS 1987. FBA 2012

Selected publications

 
The Waldenses 1170-1530: Between a Religious Order and a Church. Ashgate, Aldershot, 2001. Variorum Collected Studies
The Measure of Multitude: Population in Medieval Thought. Oxford University Press, Oxford, 2000.

References 

Academics of the University of York
British medievalists
Fellows of the British Academy
Fellows of Oriel College, Oxford
Fellows of the Royal Historical Society
Living people
People educated at St Benedict's School, Ealing
Year of birth missing (living people)